Spheneria is a genus of plants in the grass family. The only known species is Spheneria kegelii, native to Guyana, Suriname, and Brazil (States of Pará, Mato Grosso, + Amazonas).

References

Panicoideae
Monotypic Poaceae genera
Flora of South America